The Preston School of Industry, also known as Preston Castle, was a reform school located in Ione, California, in Amador County. It was proposed by, and ultimately named after, state senator Edward Myers Preston. The cornerstone was laid in December 1890, and the institution was opened in June 1894 when seven wards (minors under the guardianship of the state, but not necessarily juvenile offenders), were transferred there from San Quentin State Prison. It is considered one of the oldest and best-known reform schools in the United States.

The original building, known colloquially as "Preston Castle" (or simply "The Castle"), is the most significant example of Romanesque Revival architecture in the Mother Lode.  This building was vacated in 1960, shortly after new buildings had been constructed to replace it, and has since been named a California Historical Landmark (#867), and listed on the National Register of Historic Places (NPS-75000422).

In 1982, the building was partly used as The Bleeding Heart Orphanage in the movie Bad Manners, released in 1984.

In 1999, the institution's official name, applied to the newer 1960 buildings, was changed to the "Preston Youth Correctional Facility".

In 2010, the California Department of Corrections and Rehabilitation announced that the facility was to close, and a closing ceremony was held on June 2, 2011.

In popular culture
In 1982, the building was partly used as "The Bleeding Heart Orphanage" in the movie Bad Manners, released in 1984.

The 2014 film A Haunting at Preston Castle is set at the castle and surrounding area, as is the 2019 movie Apparition.

The first episode of season 2 of the TV series Ghost Adventures is about Preston Castle.

Ghost Hunters investigated the castle's paranormal reports in season 6, episode 6.

The facility is the subject of The Lowe Files Season 1, Episode 1: "Haunted Boy's Reformatory".

Former wards

Former Preston wards include:

References

Further reading

External links

 Photos of Preston Castle by Angelica R. Jackson, 2007-present  
 Preston Castle Foundation home page

Buildings and structures in Amador County, California
California Historical Landmarks
Defunct prisons in California
Romanesque Revival architecture in California
School buildings on the National Register of Historic Places in California
Unused buildings in California
Tourist attractions in Amador County, California
National Register of Historic Places in Amador County, California
1890 establishments in California